Bokyi (Boki, Nfua, Nki, Okii, Osikom, Osukam, Uki, Vaaneroki) is a regionally important Bendi language spoken by the Bokyi people of northern Cross River State, Nigeria. It is ranked amongst the first fifteen languages of the about 520 living languages in Nigeria, with a few thousand speakers in Cameroon.

Major dialects include Abu (Abo, Baswo), Irruan, Osokom (Okundi) and Wula.

References

Bendi languages
Languages of Nigeria